The 2024 California elections will take place on November 5, 2024. The Statewide Direct Primary Election will be held on March 5, 2024.

See also
 2024 California State Senate election
 2024 California State Assembly election

References

2024 California elections
California